1077 Campanula, provisional designation , is a presumed Erigonian asteroid, approximately  in diameter, located in the inner region of the asteroid belt. It was discovered on 6 October 1926, by German astronomer Karl Reinmuth at the Heidelberg Observatory in southwest Germany. The asteroid was named after the bellflower Campanula.

Classification and orbit 

Campanula is considered to be a member of the Erigone family, which is named after 163 Erigone, while other sources classify it as a background asteroid, not associated to any known asteroid family. It orbits the Sun in the inner main-belt at a distance of 1.9–2.9 AU once every 3 years and 8 months (1,353 days). Its orbit has an eccentricity of 0.20 and an inclination of 5° with respect to the ecliptic. The body's observation arc begins at Heidelberg, 2 months after its official discovery observation.

Naming 

This minor planet was named for the bellflower Campanula. The official naming citation was mentioned in The Names of the Minor Planets by Paul Herget in 1955.

Reinmuth's flowers 

Due to his many discoveries, Karl Reinmuth submitted a large list of 66 newly named asteroids in the early 1930s. This list also contained a sequence of 28 asteroids, starting with 1054 Forsytia, that were all named after plants, in particular flowering plants (also see list of minor planets named after animals and plants).

Physical characteristics 

Campanula is an assumed stony S-type asteroid, which is not in line with the darker C- and X-types seen among the Erigonian asteroids.

Rotation period and poles 

Several rotational lightcurves of Campanula were obtained from photometric observations. Lightcurve analysis gave a rotation period of 3.847 to 3.852 hours with a brightness variation of 0.24 to 0.40 magnitude. A 2016-published lightcurve, using modeled photometric data from the Lowell Photometric Database (LPD), gave a concurring period of 3.850486 hours, as well as two spin axis of (178.0°, 76.0°) and (313.0°, 59.0°) in ecliptic coordinates (λ, β).

Diameter and albedo 

According to observations taken at the Balzaretto Observatory and the survey carried out by the NEOWISE mission of NASA's Wide-field Infrared Survey Explorer, Campanula measures between 7.55 and 9.709 kilometers in diameter and its surface has an albedo between 0.225 and 0.33. The Collaborative Asteroid Lightcurve Link assumes a standard albedo for stony asteroids of 0.20 and calculates a diameter of 9.40 kilometers based on an absolute magnitude of 12.50.

See also

Notes

References

External links 
 Lightcurve Database Query (LCDB), at www.minorplanet.info
 Dictionary of Minor Planet Names, Google books
 Asteroids and comets rotation curves, CdR – Geneva Observatory, Raoul Behrend
 Discovery Circumstances: Numbered Minor Planets (1)-(5000) – Minor Planet Center
 
 

001077
Discoveries by Karl Wilhelm Reinmuth
Named minor planets
19261006